The Social Security System (SSS) is a state-run, social insurance program in the Philippines to workers in the private, professional and informal sectors. SSS is established by virtue of Republic Act No. 1161, better known as the Social Security Act of 1954. This law was later amended by Republic Act No. 8282 in 1997. Government employees, meanwhile, are covered under a separate state-pension fund by the Government Service Insurance System (GSIS).

History
President Manuel Roxas, to give relief to the people who were facing difficulties in the post-war period, called on the legislators to create a social security program in his State of the Nation Address in January 1948 but he died without passing the bill.

On July 7, 1948, President Elpidio Quirino succeeded Roxas and created the social security study commission through Executive Order No. 150. The commission drafted the Social Security Act that was submitted to Congress. In 1954, Representative Floro Crisologo, Senators Cipriano Primicias and Manuel Briones introduced bills to the Congress that were eventually enacted as Republic Act 1161 or the Social Security Act of 1954 during the term of Ramon Magsaysay. The law was also called the Social Security Law (SSS Law).

However, its implementation was delayed by objections made by business and labor groups. It was only in 1957 bills were presented in Congress creating the Republic Act No. 1792, amending the original Social Security Act. On September 1, 1957, the Social Security Act of 1954 was finally implemented under Carlos P. Garcia's term (Magsaysay died March that year).

On September 7, 1979, the Presidential Decree No. 1636 amended the Republic Act No. 1161 and extended compulsory coverage to people who identified as self-employed. The new rules which took effect on January 1, 1980. New rules allowed farmers and fisherfolks to be included in the coverage in 1992 and the year after, household helpers earning at least ₱1,000 monthly. The SSS, in 1995, covered laborers in informal sector earning the same wage monthly.

On May 1, 1997, President Fidel V. Ramos signed Republic Act No. 8282, also known as Social Security Act of 1997. The law amended the SSS and provided better benefit packages, expansion of coverage, flexibility in investments, stiffer penalties for violators of the law, condonation of penalties of delinquent employers, and the establishment of a voluntary provident fund for members.

SSS transferred the administration of its Medicare program, which gave benefits for the healthcare purposes of members, to the Philippine Health Insurance Corporation (PhilHealth) when Republic Act No. 7875 or the National Health Insurance Act of 1995 was enacted. In 2017, about 2.2 million people receiving pension from the SSS saw their take-home benefits increased by ₱1,000 with the approval of President Rodrigo Duterte.

Starting with a fund of ₱500,000 from the government, SSS' total assets grew to ₱474.7 billions and served 34.2 million members in 2016. In 2018, the Republic Act No. 11199 or the Social Security Act of 2018 was passed, providing mandatory inclusion of Filipinos working domestically and internationally.

Services
SSS provides death, funeral, maternity leave, permanent disability, retirement, sickness and involuntary separation/unemployment benefits. The Employees' Compensation (EC) Program which started in 1975 provided double compensation to workers who had illness, accident during work-related activities, or died. EC benefits are granted only to members with employers other than themselves.

SSS members can make 'salary' or 'calamity' loans. Salary loans are calculated based on a member's particular monthly salary credit. Calamity loans are for instances when the government has declared a state of calamity in the area where an SSS member lives, following disasters such as flooding and earthquakes.

PESO Fund 
The SSS PESO (Personal Equity Savings Option) Fund is a voluntary savings program that members can utilize to augment their retirement benefits from the regular membership. Launched in September 2014, it is a provident fund that gives tax-free returns and it can be made available effective upon the retirement of the members or when certain conditions are met, such as permanent disability. The fund gives members the power to choose beneficiaries, and it provides three account options: medical expenses, retirement and  disability, and other needs.

Flexi Fund 
Flexi Fund is a voluntary savings program offered by SSS. Launched in 2001, it is a provident fund that is invested in fixed income securities and whose returns are determined by SSS' short-term placements or 91-day Treasury bills. It is open to overseas Filipino workers (OFW) who are not older than 60 years old.

Membership requirements
He/she must be at least 15 years old.
Non-working persons are welcome.
In order for a member of SSS to claim lifetime monthly pension, he must be at least 60 years old and he must have at least 120 monthly contributions.

Branches
SSS' offices are located in 291 branches all over the country. There is an option to email or make a call to SSS’ branches. Members can utilize the toll-free number that is open on weekdays and online services for transactions such as securing SSS identification number and applying for loans, sickness and retirement benefits.

SSS Monthly Contribution
The SSS calculates monthly contributions differently for employers, employees, and self-employed people. Every payout is required for everyone in order to be in conformity with governmental labor standards, and this is shown to the employee on the payslip. The concept behind the monthly deductions is that, in the long run, the person may receive just compensation for all the years or months of payment that have been actually paid in, notwithstanding how inconvenient they may first seem. Currently, both the employer (8.50 percent) and the employee each contribute 13 percent of the monthly salary credit up to P25,000 for SSS (4.50 percent).

List of chairpersons
Corazon dela Paz (January 20, 2001 – July 31, 2008)
Romulo Neri (August 2008–June 30, 2010)
Juan B. Santos (August 23, 2010–June 2016)
Amado D. Valdez (October 2016–February 12, 2018)
Aurora C. Ignacio (September 2018–March 5, 2019)
Carlos G. Dominguez III (ex officio; March 5, 2019 – June 30, 2022)
Benjamin Diokno (ex officio; June 30, 2022–present)

References

External links
Philippine Social Security System
How To Get SSS ID Number Online Quickly
How To Compute Your SSS Monthly Contribution
New SSS Contributions Effective 2023

Financial services companies established in 1997
Government-owned and controlled corporations of the Philippines
Social security in the Philippines